John Clancy may refer to:

Politicians
 John Clancy (Labour politician), leader of Birmingham City Council
 John Michael Clancy (1837–1903), United States Representative from New York
 John R. Clancy (1859–1932), United States Representative from New York
 John T. Clancy (1903–1985), U.S. politician from Brooklyn, New York City
 J. J. Clancy (North Dublin MP) (1847–1928), Irish Member of Parliament North Dublin, 1885–1918
 J. J. Clancy (Sinn Féin politician) (1891–1932), Irish Teachta Dála North Sligo, 1918–1921

Sports
 Jack Clancy (born 1944), American football player
 Jack Clancy (Australian footballer) (1934–2014), Australian rules footballer

Others

 John Clancy (Medal of Honor) (1860s–?), American soldier and Medal of Honor recipient
 John Clancy (playwright), American playwright and theater director
 John Joseph Clancy (bishop) (1856–1912), Bishop of Elphin from 1895 to 1912
 John S. J. Clancy (1895–1970), Australian judge
 John William Clancy (1888–1969), U.S. federal judge